Balkunwa  is a village in Barwani District of Madhya Pradesh state of India.

References

Villages in Barwani district